Cisowa may refer to the following places:
Cisowa, Gdynia (north Poland)
Cisowa, Łódź Voivodeship (central Poland)
Cisowa, Silesian Voivodeship (south Poland)
Cisowa, Subcarpathian Voivodeship (south-east Poland)
Cisowa, Lubusz Voivodeship (west Poland)